Gadolinium acetylacetonate is a compound with formula Gd(C5H7O2)3(H2O)2. It is a gadolinium(III) complex with three acetylacetonate and two aquo ligands.

Uses
Gadolinium acetylacetonate, along with cerium acetylacetonate, can be used as precursors to synthesize gadolinia-doped ceria (GDC) gel powders using the sol-gel method.

References

Acetylacetonate complexes
Organogadolinium compounds